Huckle is an English and German surname. Notable people with the surname include:

Adam Huckle (born 1971), Zimbabwean cricketer
Alan Huckle (born 1948), British colonial administrator
James Huckle (born 1990), English sport shooter
Patrick Huckle (born 1983), German footballer
Richard Huckle (1986–2019), convicted English sex offender, "Britain's worst paedophile"
Theodore Huckle, Welsh barrister
Wilbur Huckle (born 1941), American professional baseball player